The Flood Mythology of China, or Great Flood of China (also known as ) is a deluge theme which happened in China. Derk Bodde (1961) stated that "from all mythological themes in ancient Chinese, the earliest and so far most pervasive is about flood." The mythology also has shared characteristics with other Great Floods all over the world, although it also has unique characteristics or different focuses. Lu Yilu (2002) groups all versions of great flood into three themes: "the heroes controls the flood; "brother-sister marriage to repopulating the world"; and "the flood which is drowning the whole city along with its citizens".

History and mythology

Literary history
The history of China as a continuously recorded literary tradition begins with the ancient documents transmitted to posterity through the Records of the Grand Historian. According to these, the great-grandson (or fourth successor) of the Yellow Emperor was Yao. Beginning with the reign of Yao, additional literary sources become available, including the Book of Documents (collected and edited by Confucius), which begins with the "Canon of Yao", describing the events of Yao's reign. Although, the "Canon of Yao" is problematic in regards to textual transmission (at best it seems to represent an early textual reconstruction and at worst a fabrication based on available knowledge or sources from the 3rd or 4th centuries AD). "The Counsels of Great Yu"  is considered to be one of the reliably transmitted pre-Qin texts. In any case, these and other texts of the preserved literature mark the beginnings of the Chinese historical tradition. Other important texts include the poem Heavenly Questions collected in the Chu Ci which is attributed to Qu Yuan and the famous mythological compendium Classic of Mountains and Seas (Shanhaijing). Furthermore, centuries of scholarship have gone into piecing together a narrative from the bits, pieces, and occasionally longer sections found in these and other early sources, sometimes being subjected to heavy editorial handling in terms of viewpoint.

Collected mythology
Mythological stories besides having been preserved both in various literary forms, have also been collected from various oral traditions, some of these folktales are still told. Some of these sources are from people of the Han ethnicity and some from other ethnic groups.

The struggles to control the flood
The Zhou sources narrated the struggles of the heroes or deities to control the floods. From all of these stories, the struggle of Yao, Gun, and Yu is the most obvious in describing the hardness of human effort to control the flood. Much later works from the Warring States period (Shiben) and Diwang Shiji (3rd century) were pairing Yu and Nuwa as a couple and their previously uncorrelated stories were then completing each other.

Gun-Yu Mythology

This theme is based on the efforts of Great Yu (and Gun) to control the flood, sometimes is also associated with Emperor Yao and Shun, and the initial efforts of human to domesticated wild animals as pack animals and livestock. The theme outline narrates Gun stole xirang to stop the flood while Great Yu channeled the flood into the sea and succeeded to subsided the water level, and so the earth can be cultivated. There are so many mythologies which are correlated to this theme, one of which is "Dragon Gate" -a canal through the mountains which was dug by Yu. While he was digging the canal, many of the carps were swept away and fell, they were so disappointed because they couldn't swim back into the upper level. Yu promised them, if any of the carp could leap through his dam, it would transform into a dragon, thus the place inherited its name.

Gun-Yu theme is also have political background. Huainanzi stated that the great flood was caused by Gong Gong who was use the water to make havoc on the realm of Emperor Yao. Shan Hai Jing narrated another version that the flood was caused by Xiangliu, one of Gong Gong's minister, and was not Gong Gong himself.

Nuwa repaired the heaven

The story happened after Goddess Nüwa created (molded) humanity from yellow clay, brought them into life, and gave them the ability to reproduce. Gonggong was banging his head into Mount Buzhou, which actually was the pillar to support the heaven. Nüwa then patched the sky with five-colored pebbles and piled up reeds ashes to stop the flood.

The extinction of human race

Chen Jianxian (1996) said that this theme was one of some popular legends which was still being told by more than 40 ethnics in China. There is a possibility that the myth is rather new because the oldest recorded sources about this myth were from Six Dynasties, save that the oral tradition maybe much older.

The theme was made into several versions, but the outline is about a great flood which was destroyed all the humans all over the world except a pair of brother and sister, or aunt and nephew. Both were forced to married in order to repopulated the world. One version stated that their children were ordinary humans, while the others said it was a lump of meat, squash, melon, or grindstone; after they opened, cut, or destroyed it, humans emerged.

Sinking city

This theme have some specific characteristics: one or two people were survived, the statue which was crying blood, and the whole city along with its citizens were sinking. The survivor(s) was being saved by the gods because of his/her benevolent acts; may be an old lady or a devoted son. The blood crying statue was often a stone lion statue, or sometimes tortoise statue.

Other flood myths

East Sea and Mulberry Field

A less widespread flood myth involves the goddess Magu: this myth involves the cyclic rise and fall of the ocean level over the eons: sometimes the sea floor is under water; at other times, it turns into mulberry fields. However, the material about Magu seems to be distinct from the idea of a great flood upon the land of China.

One tradition narrates Magu, a benevolent Taoist lady who lived on the second century. She was reclaiming a very wide seashore water bodies on Kiangsu and changing it into mulberry fields.

Heyu
Shan Hai Jing mentions a pig-like creature with human face, yellow-colored and red-tailed, and it sounds like human singing. The creature is known as Heyu; it preys on human, reptiles, and snakes. It appearance is a sign that there will be a great deluge all over the world.

See also
Chinese myth
Flood myth

References

History of ancient China
Chinese mythology
Flood myths
Floods in China